Ian Michael Baker-Finch (born 24 October 1960) is an Australian professional golfer and sports commentator, who is best known for winning The Open Championship in 1991.

Early years
Baker-Finch was born in Nambour, Queensland, Australia. He grew up in the same Queensland "neighbourhood" as fellow professional golfers Greg Norman and Wayne Grady.

Professional golf career
Baker-Finch turned professional in 1979. He credits Jack Nicklaus as his greatest influence, saying that he based his game on Nicklaus' book, Golf My Way.

Baker-Finch began his professional career on the PGA Tour of Australasia, winning his first professional tournament, the New Zealand Open, in 1983. That victory earned him an entry to The Open Championship in 1984. He would make headlines by taking the 36-hole lead, holding onto the lead after three rounds but then shooting a disastrous last round 79 to finish ninth, much in the manner of Bobby Clampett who had endured a similar collapse two years previously.

Baker-Finch joined the European Tour, winning the 1985 Scandinavian Enterprise Open and finishing in the top-20 on the order of merit in both 1985 and 1986. At the same time he continued to play in Australasia in the Northern Hemisphere winter, picking up several further tournament titles there and occasionally played on the Japan Golf Tour.

Baker-Finch first played on the PGA Tour as an invitee in 1985 and began to do so regularly in 1989, having qualified for tour membership by finishing third in the 1988 World Series of Golf. He won his first PGA Tour title at the 1989 Southwestern Bell Colonial, gaining him a two-year exemption on Tour. In 1990, he finished 16th on the PGA Tour money list, on the strength of three runner-up finishes and two third-places.

Despite his steady career, with wins on four continents, including Asia, Baker-Finch was not generally counted as a member of the elite group of international golfers. When he won the 1991 Open Championship at Royal Birkdale, closing with a 64-66 to beat Mike Harwood by two strokes, he was considered a surprise champion. He had three other runner-up finishes that year as well and again qualified for the Tour Championship with a 13th-place finish on the money list. He ranked briefly in the top-10 of the Official World Golf Ranking that year.

Baker-Finch had a 10-year exemption from the PGA Tour for his Open Championship win, leaving him exempt until 2001. He achieved a runner-up finish in The Players Championship in 1992, but otherwise never came close to contending on the PGA Tour again. He picked up wins in Australia in 1992 and 1993 but his form then went into a steep and accelerating decline. He began to lose confidence in his game and tinkered with his swing often. His last top-10 finish on the PGA Tour was a tie for 10th in the 1994 Masters Tournament.

Baker-Finch then famously suffered a complete collapse of his game. The problems were often psychological: he would hit shots flawlessly on the practice range, and then go to the first tee and hit a weak drive into the wrong fairway. In the 1995 Open Championship at St Andrews, he notoriously hooked his first round tee-shot at the first out-of-bounds on the left side of the fairway shared with the 18th, with attention focused on him as his playing partner was Arnold Palmer, competing in his final Open. In 1995 and 1996 he missed the cut, withdrew after one round or was disqualified in all 29 PGA Tour events that he entered.

Baker-Finch later said: "I lost my confidence. I got to the point where I didn't even want to be out on the golf course because I was playing so poorly. I would try my hardest but when I came out to play, I managed to find a way to miss the cut time and time again. It became a habit."

After shooting a 92 in the first round of the 1997 Open at Royal Troon, an extraordinarily bad score by tournament professional standards, Baker-Finch admitted that he cried in the locker room that afternoon. He withdrew from the championship after one round and retired from tournament golf.

The only PGA Tour events Baker-Finch has played since the 1997 Open Championship was the 2001 MasterCard Colonial, where he missed the cut with rounds of 74 and 77, and the same tournament, now named Crowne Plaza Invitational at Colonial in 2009, again missing the cut with rounds of 68 and 78.

In 2003, 2005 and 2007, Baker-Finch served as Gary Player's captain's assistant for the International team in the Presidents Cup.

On 22 June 2000, Baker-Finch was awarded the Australian Sports Medal for his golfing achievements.

In 2009 Baker-Finch was inducted into the Queensland Sport Hall of Fame.

TV golf analyst career
After his game deserted him, Baker-Finch turned his interests to careers in broadcasting and golf course design and management. He was hired by ESPN and ABC Sports to commentate on golf tournaments in 1998, and did so until 2006. During this time, Baker-Finch served as the lead analyst for ESPN and as a hole announcer for ABC, though on many occasions he filled in as ABC's lead analyst. In 2007, he was hired by CBS Sports as a hole announcer, a position he still holds today.

Reporting for CBS at the 2007 Barclays tournament, Baker-Finch was one of the thousands gathered around the 18th green as Rich Beem hit his approach shot. The errant shot hit straight on Baker-Finch's cheek and knocked him down, causing him to fall on his back behind the green. Baker-Finch recovered before Beem got to his ball.

Personal life
Baker-Finch and his wife, Jennie, have two daughters Hayley and Laura; they live in North Palm Beach, Florida.

Professional wins (17)

PGA Tour wins (2)

PGA Tour playoff record (0–1)

European Tour wins (2)

European Tour playoff record (0–1)

Japan Golf Tour wins (3)

PGA Tour of Australasia wins (10)

PGA Tour of Australasia playoff record (2–1)

Senior wins (1)
2013 Liberty Mutual Insurance Legends of Golf - Raphael Division (with Bart Bryant)

Major championships

Wins (1)

Results timeline

CUT = missed the half way cut
WD = Withdrew
"T" indicates a tie for a place.

Summary

Most consecutive cuts made – 9 (1992 Masters – 1994 Masters)
Longest streak of top-10s – 1 (six times)

Results in The Players Championship

CUT = missed the halfway cut
WD = withdrew
"T" indicates a tie for a place

Team appearances
World Cup (representing Australia): 1985
Four Tours World Championship (representing Australasia): 1985, 1986, 1987, 1988, 1989, 1990 (winners), 1991
Dunhill Cup (representing Australia): 1989, 1992

See also
List of men's major championships winning golfers

Notes

References

External links

Ian Baker-Finch interview from Sports Business Daily

Australian male golfers
PGA Tour of Australasia golfers
European Tour golfers
PGA Tour golfers
Winners of men's major golf championships
Golf writers and broadcasters
Recipients of the Australian Sports Medal
People from Nambour, Queensland
People from North Palm Beach, Florida
Sportspeople from the Sunshine Coast
Sportsmen from Queensland
1960 births
Living people